Voacanga is a genus of plants in the family Apocynaceae found in Africa, Southeast Asia, New Guinea, and Australia.  the World Checklist of Selected Plant Families recognises 13 species:

Species
 Voacanga africana Stapf ex Scott-Elliot - tropical W + C + E + S Africa
 Voacanga bracteata Stapf - tropical W + C Africa
 Voacanga caudiflora Stapf - tropical W Africa
 Voacanga chalotiana Pierre ex Stapf - tropical C Africa
 Voacanga foetida (Blume) Rolfe -Java, Borneo, Sumatra, Philippines 
 Voacanga globosa (Blanco) Merr. - Philippines
 Voacanga gracilipes (Miq.) Markgr. - Maluku
 Voacanga grandifolia (Miq.) Rolfe - Indonesia, Philippines, New Guinea, Queensland
 Voacanga havilandii Ridl. - Sarawak
 Voacanga megacarpa Merr. - Philippines
 Voacanga pachyceras Leeuwenb. - Zaïre
 Voacanga psilocalyx Pierre ex Stapf - Nigeria, Cameroon, Gabon, Republic of Congo 
 Voacanga thouarsii Roem. & Schult. Madagascar; widespread from Cape Province to Sudan + Senegal

formerly included
 Voacanga dichotoma = Tabernaemontana pachysiphon
 Voacanga plumeriifolia = Tabernaemontana macrocarpa

Gallery

References

 
Apocynaceae genera